Shchyokinsky District  (Çjokinskij rajón) is an administrative district (raion), one of the twenty-three in Tula Oblast, Russia. Within the framework of municipal divisions, it is incorporated as Shchyokinsky Municipal District. It is located in the center of the oblast. Its administrative center is the town of Shchyokino. Population: 106,595 (2010 Census);  The population of the administrative center accounts for 54.5% of the district's total population.

References

Notes

Sources

Districts of Tula Oblast